Allred is a ghost town situated in Nye County, Nevada. A post office in the settlement opened on April 17, 1911 with Allen Oxborrow and George Kump as postmasters. The post office was closed more than a year later on October 31, 1912. There are no visible remains left of Allred.

References

External links
 Allred (ghosttowns.com)

Ghost towns in Nevada
Ghost towns in Nye County, Nevada